Griphocosma is a monotypic moth genus in the family Cosmopterigidae described by Thomas Bainbrigge Fletcher in 1929. It contains only one species, Griphocosma citroplecta, described by Edward Meyrick in 1917, which is found in Busa, India.

This species has a wingspan of 8–9 mm. The forewings are pale citron yellow chequered with small olive-fuscous spots and marks.

References

External links

Cosmopterigidae
Monotypic moth genera